Luís Carlos Pereira Carneiro (born 8 September 1988), known as Licá, is a Portuguese footballer who plays as a right winger who plays for ACDR Lamelas.

He amassed Primeira Liga totals of 229 matches and 40 goals over 11 seasons, after starting his professional career with Académica. He represented six other top-flight clubs, mainly Estoril and Belenenses SAD. He also had brief spells in Spain and England.

Licá won one cap for Portugal, in 2013.

Club career

Early years
Born in Lamelas, Castro Daire, Licá joined Académica de Coimbra from the lower leagues in 2007, aged 19. He appeared rarely for the club over two Primeira Liga seasons, also being loaned to another modest side, G.D. Tourizense, during his contract; he scored his first goal in the top division on 22 February 2009, helping to a 3–1 home win against C.S. Marítimo.

In the 2010 January transfer window, Licá moved on loan to C.D. Trofense in the Segunda Liga, netting five goals in 27 games in his first full season as the Trofa team narrowly missed on promotion. From 2011 to 2013, he represented G.D. Estoril Praia; after finding the net on 12 occasions in his first year, being essential as his team returned to the top flight after seven years, he added six in all 30 matches in the second to help them overachieve for a final fifth position, with the subsequent qualification to the UEFA Europa League.

Porto
Licá signed for FC Porto on 29 May 2013, agreeing to a four-year contract. He scored his first official goal for his new team on 10 August, the first in a 3–0 victory over Vitória S.C. for the Portuguese Supercup.

On 1 August 2014, deemed surplus to requirements as practically all Portuguese players by new manager Julen Lopetegui, Licá was loaned to La Liga club Rayo Vallecano in a season-long move. He made his debut in the competition on 21 September, starting in a 4–2 away loss to Villarreal CF.

Nottingham Forest
On 31 August 2016, after a top-tier campaign with Vitória de Guimarães, Licá was released by Porto and signed for Nottingham Forest on a two-year deal, for a fee believed to be around £300,000. He first appeared in the EFL Championship on 14 September, featuring six minutes in a 2–2 draw at Rotherham United.

Licá returned to Portugal on 6 February 2017, joining former club Estoril on loan until the end of the season. Both he and the Cascais-based side wanted to make the deal permanent, but this never came to be because of wage demands.

On 31 August 2017, he mutually agreed to terminate his contract with Forest and signed with Segunda División side Granada CF later the same day. Having made only two substitute cameos in the league and started one Copa del Rey match, he was released on 31 January.

Later years
A free agent, Licá joined C.F. Os Belenenses on a four-month deal on 1 February 2018, extending his contract until 2020 that May. He scored a career-best in the Portuguese top division of 11 goals for the reorganised Belenenses SAD in 2018–19, including March's goal of the month against Portimonense S.C. in a 2–2 draw.

On 14 November 2020, Licá joined S.C. Farense, again at zero cost until the end of the season. In a campaign that ended with relegation, he received the first red card of his career in a 3–1 home victory over Gil Vicente F.C. on 10 January.

Licá returned to last-placed Belenenses SAD on 10 February 2022, having been out of work since the summer. He returned to his hometown one year later, signing with amateurs ACDR Lamelas in the Viseu Football Association's district leagues.

International career
Licá was part of the Portugal under-21 team that took silver at the 2009 Lusofonia Games on home soil. He played all four matches, scoring in a 4–1 win over Angola on the final day.

On 10 September 2013, shortly after having moved to Porto, Licá made his debut for the senior national team, playing the last six minutes of a 1–3 friendly loss to Brazil at the Gillette Stadium in the United States.

Personal life
Licá's father and his older brother Pedro Jorge were also footballers. While the latter spent a couple of youth years at Boavista FC, both mainly played for local amateur clubs.

Honours
Estoril
Segunda Liga: 2011–12

Porto
Supertaça Cândido de Oliveira: 2013

Portugal U21
Lusofonia Games: Silver medal 2009

Individual
Segunda Liga Player of the Year: 2011–12
SJPF Segunda Liga Player of the Month: December 2011, February 2012
SJPF Segunda Liga Young Player of the Month: September 2011, December 2011, January 2012, February 2012

References

External links

1988 births
Living people
People from Castro Daire
Sportspeople from Viseu District
Portuguese footballers
Association football wingers
Primeira Liga players
Liga Portugal 2 players
Segunda Divisão players
Associação Académica de Coimbra – O.A.F. players
G.D. Tourizense players
C.D. Trofense players
G.D. Estoril Praia players
FC Porto players
Vitória S.C. players
C.F. Os Belenenses players
Belenenses SAD players
S.C. Farense players
La Liga players
Segunda División players
Rayo Vallecano players
Granada CF footballers
English Football League players
Nottingham Forest F.C. players
Portugal under-21 international footballers
Portugal international footballers
Portuguese expatriate footballers
Expatriate footballers in Spain
Expatriate footballers in England
Portuguese expatriate sportspeople in Spain
Portuguese expatriate sportspeople in England